Gareth David Lloyd (born 28 March 1981), known professionally as Gareth David-Lloyd, is a Welsh actor and writer best known for his role as Ianto Jones in the British science fiction series Torchwood.

Early life
He was born in Bettws, Newport. David-Lloyd's first acting role was as a robot in a junior school play.  As a teenager, he joined the Gwent Young People's Theatre in Abergavenny and The Dolman Youth Theatre in Newport. While there, he appeared in several plays, including Macbeth, The Threepenny Opera and Henry V, in which he played the title role. Gareth studied Performing Arts at Crosskeys College in South Wales. When former Labour Party leader Neil Kinnock saw the young David-Lloyd performing at Monmouth Castle, he sent him £250 to use towards his acting career.

Career

Music 
David-Lloyd fronts the progressive metal band Blue Gillespie, previously known as A Breath of Blue Fire. The band participated in Sex, Wales, and Anarchy on 20 April 2008, and Orgee on 3 May 2008, at the University of Wales Institute Cardiff. Their first EP, Cave Country, was released in December 2008 which was followed by Cave Country Part 2 which was released in August 2009. Their debut album, Synesthesia, was released in May 2010. Their second album Seven Rages of Man was released in May 2012.

Acting 
While studying at Coleg Gwent, Crosskeys, David-Lloyd appeared in various local stage productions at the Dolman Theatre in Newport and the Sherman Theatre in Cardiff. David-Lloyd went on to train at the National Youth Theatre, before moving to Reading to pursue his acting career with The Rep College. David-Lloyd's parts have included Sebastian in Twelfth Night on stage.

In the 2004 comedy/drama Mine All Mine, written by Torchwood creator Russell T Davies, he played a character named Yanto Jones. In 2005, David-Lloyd began a part-time degree in philosophy and psychological studies with the Open University.

Torchwood 

David-Lloyd returned to Wales for the filming of his first regular television role in 2006 for Doctor Who spin-off Torchwood, in which he played Ianto Jones, a member of the fictional Torchwood Institute. David-Lloyd appeared in three of four series of Torchwood and even made an appearance in the Doctor Who series 4 finale episodes "The Stolen Earth" and "Journey's End". David-Lloyd has also recorded a Torchwood audio book, The Sin Eaters, and appeared in the Torchwood audio dramas Lost Souls, Asylum, Golden Age, The Dead Line, The Lost Files, and The House of the Dead. David-Lloyd has recorded a number of M.R. James ghost stories titled Tales of the Supernatural.

Since 2015, he has reprised the role of Ianto Jones in several Torchwood audio plays for Big Finish Productions and has also written some of the scripts for those releases.

After Torchwood 

In 2009 he appeared in the short comedy film A Very British Cover-up, while also appearing as a police detective in Internet crime thriller, Girl Number Nine, also starring Tracy Ann Oberman, premiering online on 30 October 2009.

In 2010 David-Lloyd starred in an episode of the long-running ITV series The Bill first aired on 21 January 2010 and also appeared as Dr. John Watson in 2010 direct-to-DVD film Sherlock Holmes by The Asylum. He also appeared in the pantomime Cinderella at the Charter Theatre Preston playing the character of Prince Charming.

David-Lloyd also appeared in Casimir Effect, an independent short feature, starring as Dr Robert Cameron. This film began shooting in early 2010 and was released on 12 December 2011. The production company has said this is a proof of concept which will see Casimir Effect developed into a TV series.

In June 2011, Gareth appeared as a main character in the Syfy movie Red Faction: Origins based on the video games. Later in 2011, David-Lloyd appeared in a season 3 episode of the SyFy show Warehouse 13 titled "3...2...1...", as an agent of Warehouse 12 in the 1890s, partnered with H. G. Wells.

On 30 October 2012, David-Lloyd began appearing on Holby City as Rhys Hopkins, a role he played until January 2013.

In November 2018, David-Lloyd began appearing on BBC One medical drama Casualty as Joshua Bowers.

Personal life
David-Lloyd married Gemma James in 2010. The couple have a daughter, Lily, and a son, Eli. Gareth goes by "he/him and they/them" pronouns according to his Twitter.

Filmography

Video games

References

External links

1981 births
Living people
National Youth Theatre members
People from Newport, Wales
Web series directors
Welsh male film actors
Welsh male stage actors
Welsh male television actors
Welsh male video game actors
Welsh male voice actors
21st-century Welsh male actors